The Wireless Wire-Walkers, also released as Wireless Wire Walker, is a 1921 silent animated film starring Krazy Kat. The film marks the final Krazy Kat film produced by Bray Studios before the filmmakers moved to Winkler Pictures.

Plot
Krazy opens a pair of umbrellas for some reason. Momentarily, his buddy, a weasel, shows up holding some balloons. Krazy takes the balloons, and places them under the umbrellas.

Krazy and the weasel later put up an acrobatic show where hundreds of spectators come to watch. Their act involves a wire attached to two poles. The weasel is first to go on the wire, and performs well. Krazy also goes on the wire, and performs good too.

Krazy and the weasel attempt to do a wireless act as Krazy takes out the wire. The two performers then brought their umbrellas with balloons underneath. The weasel is again first to perform and manages to walk around as if there's a wire on the poles. But before Krazy could perform also, the balloons under both umbrellas burst. This infuriates the audience who start chasing them. The chase continues until everyone runs off an edge and falls into a canyon.

See also
 Krazy Kat filmography

References

External links
 The Wireless Wire-Walkers at the Big Cartoon Database

1921 animated films
1921 short films
1920s American animated films
1920s animated short films
American black-and-white films
American silent short films
Krazy Kat shorts
Films directed by Vernon Stallings
American animated short films
Bray Productions films
Animated films about cats
Films about weasels